Two Brothers Pictures  is a London-based British television production company founded in 2014 by brothers, Harry Williams and Jack Williams. The company launched with the BBC One seriesThe Missing. The show was nominated for 2 Golden Globe Awards, 4 BAFTAs and 2 Emmys as well as winning two Nymph d'Ors, Bulldog, and BPG awards.  The Missing returned in 2016 for a second series airing on BBC One and Starz.

2016 also saw Two Brothers Pictures launch their comedy Fleabag on BBC Three and Amazon written by and starring Phoebe Waller-Bridge. Fleabag's first series received numerous awards, including; BAFTA TV (Female Performance in a Comedy), Televisual (Best Comedy), Writers Guild of Great Britain (Best TV Sitcom), RTS (Best Breakthrough, Best Comedy Writer), Chortle (Best TV Comedy), BPG (Best Writer), Broadcast (Best Multichannel, Best Original Programme) and NME (Best TV Series).

Other programs include Liar, conspiracy thriller Strangers (originally titled White Dragon), Cheat and The Widow for ITV, and Rellik, Baptiste for BBC One and "The Tourist" for Stan and BBC One.

Two Brothers Pictures joined the All3Media Group in 2017.

Filmography

References 

All3Media
Mass media companies established in 2011
Television production companies of the United Kingdom
2017 mergers and acquisitions